Peter G. Marston (February 13, 1935-September 30, 2022) was an American scientist, businessman, and actor.  He served as chief executive officer of Cambridge Environmental Technology and holds a visiting professorship at the Massachusetts Institute of Technology, in the Plasma Science and Fusion Center. Marston also has served as a member of the Moscow-based International Academy of Electrotechnical Sciences.

Government service
Marston once served as head of the United States Department of Energy's National Program for Magnetohydrodynamics and High Energy Physics Technology.

Television
In the early 1980s, Marston became known to young American television audiences through his portrayal as Captain Clement Tyler Granville in The Voyage of the Mimi.  Marston starred in the original Mimi series, as well as its sequel The Second Voyage of the Mimi.  In the series, a young Ben Affleck portrayed the character of Clement's grandson.

Personal life
As of 2011, Marston resided in the vicinity of Gloucester, Massachusetts. He had at least one son, Peter Marston Jr., who died in 2011.

References

External links
 

Year of birth missing (living people)
Living people
American chief executives
American male television actors
American scientists
United States Department of Energy officials